The Pet Sounds 50th Anniversary World Tour was a worldwide concert tour by American musician Brian Wilson held to commemorate the 50th anniversary of the Beach Boys' album Pet Sounds (1966). Scheduled for more than 100 dates, it marks Wilson's final performance of the album.

Background

Wilson's first (and previous) world tour of Pet Sounds  was in 2000, which later resulted in the live album Brian Wilson Presents Pet Sounds Live (2002).

Set list

The following sets were played in Auckland, New Zealand on March 26, 2016.

Set one

Set two

Encore
"All Summer Long"
"Help Me, Rhonda"
"Barbara Ann"
"Surfin’ USA"
"Fun Fun Fun"
"Love and Mercy"

Tour dates

Personnel 

Current members:

 Brian Wilson – vocals, piano
 Al Jardine – vocals, guitar, banjo, percussion
 Mike D'amico – drums, percussion
 Bob Lizik – bass guitar
 Nelson Bragg – vocals, percussion
 Probyn Gregory – vocals, guitar, trumpet, french horn, theremin, trombone
 Matt Jardine – vocals, guitar, percussion
 Rob Bonfiglio – vocals, guitar, percussion (substituted for Matt Jardine, then replaced Wonder)
 Gary Griffin – vocals, keyboards, vibraphone
 Darian Sahanaja – vocals, keyboards, vibraphone
 Paul Von Mertens – vocals, saxophone, flute, clarinet, harmonica
 Blondie Chaplin – vocals, guitar, percussion

Special Guests:

Billy Hinsche – keyboards, vocals

Former members:

 Nicky Wonder – vocals, guitar (died August 6, 2019)
 Jim Laspesa – vocals, percussion (substitute for Nelson Bragg)
 Casey McDonough – vocals (substitute for Matt Jardine)

Absences and Lineup Changes
Darian was present at the start of the tour in March and April 2016 for the New Zealand, Australia, and Japan shows, but was subsequently absent from the tour. In his absence, various musicians filled in the vocals/keyboards spot. On July 10, 2016, both Billy Hinsche and Darian Sahanaja played the show with Billy playing the first set, Darian playing the second set, and both musicians playing the encore. Darian permanently rejoined the tour in May 2017.

In April 2017, Casey McDonough of NRBQ filled in for Matt Jardine for a few shows. For most of 2018 & 2019, Jim Laspesa filled in for Nelson Bragg. In November & December 2018, Rob Bonfiglio filled in for Matt Jardine.

In September, 2017, Gary Griffin was absent from the band's shown in Kitchener, Ontario. He returned for future shows after that.

On August 6, 2019, Nicky Wonder died at the age of 59. He was replaced by Rob Bonfiglio.

References

Brian Wilson
2016 concert tours